Lü Xiaolei (born 27 November 1982) is a Chinese retired para table tennis player. He won three Paralympic gold medals and a silver from 2004 to 2012.

Lü, who grew up in a rural family in Dongming County, Shandong, lost his right arm at the age of 7 due to an electric shock. While climbing a wall with friends to watch a movie, he had accidentally touched the power cable.

References

1982 births
Living people
Table tennis players at the 2000 Summer Paralympics
Table tennis players at the 2004 Summer Paralympics
Table tennis players at the 2008 Summer Paralympics
Table tennis players at the 2012 Summer Paralympics
Paralympic medalists in table tennis
Medalists at the 2012 Summer Paralympics
Medalists at the 2008 Summer Paralympics
Medalists at the 2004 Summer Paralympics
Chinese male table tennis players
Paralympic gold medalists for China
Paralympic silver medalists for China
Paralympic table tennis players of China
Table tennis players from Shandong
People from Dongming County
Shandong Normal University alumni
Chinese amputees
FESPIC Games competitors